Katerine Savard (born May 26, 1993) is a Canadian competitive swimmer who specializes in women's butterfly events and freestyle relay. She holds several Canadian national records in the butterfly over the 50-, 100-, and 200-metre distances in both the short and long courses.  Savard also holds the Canadian junior butterfly record in the 200-metre event.  She won the gold medal at the Summer Universiade in the 100-metre butterfly in 2012, while also garnering a medal in the 50-metre butterfly at the 2013 Universiade.  Savard won gold at the Commonwealth Games in the 100-metre butterfly in Glasgow, where she set the Commonwealth record in the process.  At the same games she also won a bronze as a member of the women's 4×100-metre medley relay team.

Personal
Savard began to swim early, her mother afraid of drowning, she dove into the water at the age of 8 months. At this time, she did not like water.  She continued to meet her Aquaventure 4 certification, where she stands out for her excellent technique in several strokes and was invited to join the sports team Swim Club UNIK from Pont-Rouge. In 2004, at 10 years old, after a few medals in regional competitions, she received the title of succession of the year of this club.

She takes more taste for competitions and decided in 2006, at age 13, to join the swim club CSQ at Quebec City which offers the Sport-Study swimming in high school the Camaradière.

Within months, intensive training led her to achieve the standard Youth and to make her first provincial team, the "Triangulaire" in 2007. She made her first provincial record in 2008. She joined her first and only Canadian junior team in 2009 and made her first Canadian record in 2011. In 2010, her performances escalated on senior teams, despite her 16 years old age, becoming a national champion in the 100-metre butterfly. In 2016, she is part of the national team and has participated in many major games including London Olympics 2012 for which she was selected at just 18 years of age.

Since 2013, she stands out on the international scene and has established a world record of the Summer Universiade in 100-metre butterfly. For 2016, she achieved a bronze at the Rio Olympic Games.

Career
At the 2015 FINA World Aquatics Championships in Kazan, Russia, she finished 5th in the 100-metre butterfly. She ended the year with the seventh world ranking position in this race. She also finished fifth in the 4×100-metre freestyle relay.

At the 2015 Pan American Games in Toronto, she won three medals. Gold and Canadian record in the 4×100-metre freestyle relay and two bronze medals in 100-metre butterfly and 200-metre freestyle relay.

In 2014 at 12th Pan Pacific Championships in Gold Coast, Australia, she won bronze medal in the 4×100-metre medley relay.

At the 2014 Commonwealth Games in Glasgow, Scotland, she won a gold medal and set a new Commonwealth record in the 100-metre butterfly and bronze medal in the 4×100-metre medley relay.

At the 2013 FINA Swimming World Cup series, she brought three silver medals in butterfly events. At Eindhoven, Netherlands, she took second place in 100-metre butterfly, and at Berlin, Germany, she had two second-place finishes in the 50-metre and 100-metre butterfly.

At the 2013 FINA World Aquatics Championships in Barcelona in Spain, she finished 5th with a Canadian record in the 100-metre butterfly. She ended the year with the fifth world ranking position in this race.

At the 2013 World Summer Universiade in Kazan, Russia, Savard broke the Universiade record in the 100-metre butterfly, while also acquiring a medal in the 50-metre butterfly at the games.

At the 2012 Summer Olympics in London, she finished 17th overall by only two hundredths of a second in the heats in the women's 100-metre butterfly. However, she still advanced to the semifinals, since Inge Dekker withdrew.  She later failed to advance to the final finishing 8th in her heat and a 16th final placement.

She also participated in the 2012 Mare Nostrum where she won six medals. At Barcelona, Spain, she won gold in the 100-metre and 200-metre butterfly and silver in the 50-metre butterfly. At Canet in France, she won silver in the 100-metre butterfly and at Monte Carlo in Monaco she won gold in the 100-metre and bronze in the 200-metre butterfly. She completed the circuit as the third best swimmer. At the 2014 FINA World Swimming Championships, she finished in 10th place at the 100-metre butterfly and 13th place at the 200-metre butterfly.

In 2016, she was officially named to Canada's Olympic team for the 2016 Summer Olympics.

In April 2017, Savard was named to Canada's 2017 World Aquatics Championships team in Budapest, Hungary.

In September 2017, Savard was named to Canada's 2018 Commonwealth Games team.

She has also had acting roles, playing the main role as a swimmer in Pascal Plante's film Nadia, Butterfly.

At the 2022 World Aquatics Championships, Savard swam in the heats of the 4x100 m freestyle relay. She was replaced by Penny Oleksiak in the event final, but shared in the team's first-ever silver medal win at the World Championships in a relay. Savard competed in the heats of the 4×200 m freestyle relay for the Canadian team, helping to the event final, where she was replaced by Kayla Sanchez. She shared in the team's bronze medal win. A month later she was part of the Canadian team for the 2022 Commonwealth Games in Birmingham. On the second day of competition, she finished fifth in the 100 m butterfly and won a bronze medal in the 4×100 m freestyle relay. Teammates Maggie Mac Neil and Rebecca Smith did the same double, which Savard called "a hard double for the three of us. We did our best and it turned out pretty well." On the third day of competition she won a silver medal with the 4×200 m freestyle relay team, and qualified in eighth position to the final of the 50 m butterfly.

Long course

Short course

See also
 List of Olympic medalists in swimming (women)
 List of Commonwealth Games medallists in swimming (women)

References

External links
 
 
 
 
 
 
 

1993 births
Living people
Canadian female butterfly swimmers
Commonwealth Games gold medallists for Canada
Commonwealth Games silver medallists for Canada
Commonwealth Games bronze medallists for Canada
Medalists at the FINA World Swimming Championships (25 m)
Olympic swimmers of Canada
Swimmers at the 2012 Summer Olympics
Swimmers at the 2014 Commonwealth Games
Swimmers at the 2015 Pan American Games
Swimmers at the 2019 Pan American Games
Pan American Games gold medalists for Canada
Pan American Games bronze medalists for Canada
Swimmers at the 2016 Summer Olympics
Olympic bronze medalists for Canada
Olympic bronze medalists in swimming
Medalists at the 2016 Summer Olympics
Commonwealth Games medallists in swimming
Pan American Games medalists in swimming
Universiade medalists in swimming
Universiade gold medalists for Canada
Universiade silver medalists for Canada
Canadian film actresses
Medalists at the 2013 Summer Universiade
Medalists at the 2017 Summer Universiade
Medalists at the 2015 Pan American Games
Medalists at the 2019 Pan American Games
Swimmers at the 2020 Summer Olympics
World Aquatics Championships medalists in swimming
Swimmers at the 2022 Commonwealth Games
21st-century Canadian women
Medallists at the 2014 Commonwealth Games
Medallists at the 2022 Commonwealth Games